The Kowloon Peninsula is a peninsula that forms the southern part of the main landmass in the territory of Hong Kong, alongside Victoria Harbour and facing toward Hong Kong Island. The Kowloon Peninsula and the area of New Kowloon are collectively known as Kowloon.

Geographically, the term "Kowloon Peninsula" may also refer to the area south of the mountain ranges of Beacon Hill, Lion Rock, Tate's Cairn, Kowloon Peak, etc. The peninsula covers five of the eighteen districts of Hong Kong. Kowloon Bay is located at the northeast of the peninsula.

Geology and reclamation
The main rock type of the peninsula consists of a medium grained monzogranite with some fine granite outcrops, part of the Kowloon Granite. Early maps and photographs show flat, low-lying land behind the beach of Tsim Sha Tsui Bay with a raised area, Kowloon Hill, in the west.

The peninsula has been significantly expanded through land reclamation from the sea, over several phases. In the south and west most of the reclamation was carried out before 1904. Reclamation in several other small areas along the main Tsim Sha Tsui waterfront was completed by 1982. Since 1994, parts of the Hung Hom Bay were reclaimed and by 2019, it had been completely extinguished. The West Kowloon Reclamation was formed as part of the Airport Core Programme and largely completed by 1995.

History
Before the actual Kowloon boundaries were established, the Kowloon Peninsula served as one of the first destinations for escape during China's dynastic times. In 1287, the last emperor of the Song dynasty, Emperor Bing was fleeing from the Mongol leader Kublai Khan. Taking refuge in a cave in the Kowloon peninsula, the inscription wrote "Sung Wong Toi" or "Song Emperor's Pavilion". In the 17th century, after the fall of the Ming dynasty, many of the Emperor's followers also found shelter in the Kowloon peninsula to hide from the Manchus.

Historically speaking, Kowloon Peninsula refers to the ceded territories of Kowloon in 1860 as part of the Convention of Peking, but geographically it covers the entire Kowloon south of the mountain ranges of Lion Rock, Kowloon Peak and other hills. Kowloon Peninsula had a population of 800 when it was ceded to the British empire in 1860.

In 1898 a resolution was passed by the Colonial Hong Kong Legislative Council to preserve the land where some of the caves stand.

City landscape

See also
Boundary Street
Kowloon
List of islands and peninsulas of Hong Kong
List of places in Hong Kong
New Kowloon

References

Peninsulas of Hong Kong
Kowloon